Absolmsia is a genus of flowering plants of the family Apocynaceae of two species, native to Southwest of China and Borneo. The genus commemorates Hermann zu Solms-Laubach.

Species 
 Absolmsia oligophylla China: Yunnan
 Absolmsia spartioides Borneo

References 

Apocynaceae genera
Flora of Borneo
Flora of Yunnan
Asclepiadoideae